Hohenburg may refer to:

Settlements
 Hohenburg, Bavaria, a municipality in Bavaria, Germany
 Hohenburg an der Weichsel, the German name for Wyszogród, Poland

Castles
 Burgruine Hohenburg auf Rosenberg, a ruined medieval castle in Carinthia, Austria
 Hohenburg (Lenggries), a ruined medieval castle in Lenggries, Bavaria
 Schloss Hohenburg, an 18th-century palace in Lenggries, Bavaria
 Château de Hohenbourg, a ruined castle in Alsace, France
 Hohenburg Castle (Homburg), a ruined castle in Saarland, Germany

Other structures
 Hohenburg Abbey, now usually known as Mont Sainte-Odile Abbey, in Alsace, France

See also
Hohenberg (disambiguation)
Homburg